Zeger is a Dutch-language masculine given name. It is derived from the Germanic roots "sigi-" (victory) and "-her" (lord). Related spellings are Seger, Segher, Sieger and Zeeger. People with the name include:

Zeger
 Zeger III of Ghent (died 1227), Flemish noble
 Zeger II of Edingen (died 1364), Brabantian/Walloon Count
 Zeger Bernhard van Espen (1646–1728), Flemish canonist
 Zeger Jacob van Helmont (1683–1726), Flemish painter and tapestry designer
Zeeger
 Zeeger Gulden (1875–1960), Dutch architect
Seger
 Seger Ellis (1904–1995), American jazz pianist and vocalist
Segher
 , 13th-century Brabantian writer
Sieger
  (born 1977), Dutch actor

See also 
 Seger, a surname and a town in Pennsylvania
 Seeger, a surname
 Sieger Tod, 1920 German silent film ("Death the Victor")

References 

Dutch masculine given names